G1.9+0.3 is a supernova remnant (SNR) in the constellation of Sagittarius. It is the youngest-known SNR in the Milky Way, resulting from an explosion the light from which would have reached Earth some time between 1890 and 1908. The explosion was not seen from Earth as it was obscured by the dense gas and dust of the Galactic Center, where it occurred. The remnant's young age was established by combining data from NASA's Chandra X-ray Observatory and the VLA radio observatory. It was a type Ia supernova. The remnant has a radius of over 1.3 light-years.

Discovery
G1.9+0.3 was first identified as an SNR in 1984 from observations made with the VLA radio telescope. Because of its unusually small angular size, it was thought to be young—less than about one thousand years old. In 2007, X-ray observations made with the Chandra X-ray Observatory revealed that the object was about 15% larger than in the earlier VLA observations. Further observations made with the VLA in 2008 verified increase in size, implying it is no more than 150 years old. A more recent estimate put its observable age at 110 years as of the data collection in 2008. That study also found that it was probably triggered by the merger of two white dwarf stars.

Announcement
The discovery that G1.9+0.3 had been identified as the youngest-known Galactic SNR was announced on May 14, 2008 at a NASA press conference. In the days leading up to the announcement, NASA said that they were going "to announce the discovery of an object in our Galaxy astronomers have been hunting for more than 50 years." Before this discovery, the youngest-known Milky Way supernova remnant was Cassiopeia A, at about 330 years.

References

External links
 
 

Supernova remnants
Astronomical objects discovered in 1984
Sagittarius (constellation)